Gérard Collomb (born 20 June 1947) is a French politician who served as Mayor of Lyon from 2001 to 2017 and again from 2018 until 2020. A member of La République En Marche! (LREM) since he left the Socialist Party (PS) in 2017, he was Minister of the Interior in the first and second government of Prime Minister Édouard Philippe from 2017 to 2018. Disagreements with President Emmanuel Macron led Collomb to resign and return as Mayor of Lyon. He has been a councillor for both the City of Lyon and Lyon Metropolis since 2020.

Political career

Local politics 
Collomb was elected as a Socialist municipal councillor for the 9th arrondissement of Lyon in the 1977 French municipal elections, and has been re-elected six times since then. In 1981, aged 34, he was elected to the French National Assembly. He was re-elected in 1986 but lost his seat in 1988. From 1989 on, he led by the municipal opposition to Michel Noir on the Lyon municipal council. From 1992 to 1999 he also served as regional councillor for the Rhône-Alpes region, before his resignation.

Collomb was defeated in the 1995 local elections in Lyon, and became Mayor of the 9th arrondissement and Vice-President of the Urban Community of Lyon, until 2001. He ran as leader of the Plural Left list in the 2001 local elections. He was elected Mayor on 25 March and also elected as president of the Urban Community of Lyon, a post he held until 2014. Among the projects he has implemented is the Vélo'v.

In 2004, Collomb was re-elected Senator for the Rhône. He was re-elected as Mayor of Lyon by a large margin in March 2008, defeating Dominique Perben of the Union for a Popular Movement (UMP) in the first round by a landslide. He was re-elected again in 2014.

Ahead of the 2008 Reims Congress, Collomb led the "Hope on the left, proud to be Socialist" motion of behalf of Ségolène Royal. He was a finalist for the 2010 World Mayor prize.

Collomb has been President of the Metropolis of Lyon from 2015 to 2017. Since 2017, he has been councillor for the Metropolis of Lyon.

Career in national politics 
Collomb was one of Emmanuel Macron's first close allies and vocal supporters among leading Socialists ahead of the 2017 presidential elections. On 17 May 2017, he was named Minister of the Interior in the Philippe Government. Lyon Deputy mayor Georges Képénékian was elected as Lyon mayor succeeding Collomb.

In October 2018, Collomb prevailed in resigning in order to run again for mayor of Lyons. He was quoted saying of Macron, ‘Very few of us can still talk to" him.

Collomb was "recently revealed to have said in private that France risked a civil war unless immigration, legal and illegal, was sharply curtailed within the next five years". As minister he had "talked about France being 'flooded' by immigrants—a term frequently used by" past National Rally presidential candidate Marine Le Pen. After touring parts of Marseille, Toulouse and Paris as minister, Collomb had said, “The situation is very difficult" and used the phrase "Reconquering the Republic” to frame the challenge facing the country.

References

External links
 City Mayors profile

1947 births
Living people
French interior ministers
State ministers of France
Mayors of Lyon
People from Chalon-sur-Saône
La République En Marche! politicians
Socialist Party (France) politicians
University of Lyon alumni
Senators of Rhône (department)
Politicians from Auvergne-Rhône-Alpes